Mohamed 'Mo' Hamdaoui  (born 10 June 1993) is a Dutch professional footballer who plays as a left winger for Azerbaijan Premier League club Zira. Hamdaoui was born in the Netherlands to parents of Moroccan descent.

Club career
Hamdaoui was born in Amsterdam. After playing for Haarlem Kennemerland, HFC Haarlem, AFC Ajax and Vitesse's youth setups, he graduated with the latter in 2014, and was loaned to Eredivisie side FC Dordrecht on 29 May 2014, along with fellow Vitesse teammate Robin Gosens.

Hamdaoui made his professional debut on 20 September 2014, coming on as a late substitute for Mart Lieder in a 1–1 away draw against SBV Excelsior. In January 2015 he returned to Vitesse, after appearing in three league matches for Dordrecht.

On 15 June 2015, Hamdaoui signed a two-year deal with Go Ahead Eagles.

On 28 January 2019, Hamdaoui joined FC Twente on a half-year loan deal from De Graafschap.

Hamdaoui signed a two-year contract with Azerbaijan Premier League club Zira on 16 July 2021.

References

External links
 
Vitesse official profile 
FC Dordrecht official profile 

1993 births
Living people
Footballers from Amsterdam
Dutch footballers
Dutch expatriate footballers
Dutch sportspeople of Moroccan descent
Association football wingers
Eredivisie players
Eerste Divisie players
Azerbaijan Premier League players 
SBV Vitesse players
FC Dordrecht players
Go Ahead Eagles players
SC Telstar players
De Graafschap players
FC Twente players
Zira FK players
Expatriate footballers in Azerbaijan
Dutch expatriate sportspeople in Azerbaijan